Several naval ships of Germany were named Oldenburg after the city of Oldenburg, Germany:

 :  5,250-ton unique coastal armored ship
  (1910):  23,000-ton 
 :   (Type 130) corvette, commissioned 2013

See also

German Navy ship names